Ee Sambhashane is a 2009 Indian Kannada romance film written and directed by M. Rajashekar. The film was  produced by Major Srinivasa Poojar and Jyothi Basavarajand. It features Sandesh and Hariprriya in the lead roles. The supporting cast includes Sumalatha, Ramakrishna, Master Hirannayya and M N Lakshmidevi. The score and soundtrack for the film is by V. Manohar and the cinematography is by K. S. Chandrashekar.

Cast 

 Sandesh
 Hariprriya
 Sumalatha
 Ramakrishna
 Master Hirannayya
 M. N. Lakshmidevi
 B. Ganapathi
 Sharan
 Bullet Prakash

Soundtrack 

The film's background score and the soundtracks are composed by V. Manohar. The music rights were acquired by Raj Audio.

References

External links 

 

2000s Kannada-language films
2009 romance films
2009 films
Indian romance films
Films shot in Mysore
Films shot in Bangalore